A Foreign Affair (AFA) is an international dating and marriage agency that promotes romance tours for American men to meet women in Latin America, Southeast Asia, China, Russia, and other CIS countries. The company has over 25 years of experience in the industry and over 30,000 registered profiles.

AFA founders testified at court hearings in Washington when Senator Cantwell first pushed for the implementation of the 2005 International Marriage Broker Regulation Act (IMBRA), which, along with the 1994 Violence Against Women Act, is designed to protect women from potential abuse. Officially, the company is an international marriage agency/broker under IMBRA.

Critical reception
A feature on ABC's Nightline covered an AFA meetup in Odessa, Ukraine and found that while many of the women who attended the meetup were genuinely interested in finding an ideal match with an American man, others seemed to be taking advantage of the men by attempting to convince them to buy expensive gifts. In the segment, owner John Adams does not dispute the fact that some men may fall victim to scamming, though he says that such instances are rare.

A BBC reporter also attended a meetup in Ukraine and interviewed several attendees, finding that many of the men attended because they were frustrated about the prospects of finding an ideal match in the US, while many women attended in search of a partner who was responsible and could provide them with a better life.

A 2011 The Today Show segment featured AFA and one of its founders in light of the mail-order bride industry's success after the 2008 recession. The segment explored some common negative perceptions about the mail-order bride industry, along with concerns that relationships precipitated by websites like AFA might not be completely equal; for instance, the host was concerned that women might be pushed into such relationships due to socioeconomic factors out of their control.

AFA was also featured in a National Geographic documentary called Bachelors Abroad, a feature documentary called Love Me, Our America with Lisa Ling, and an episode of MTV's Sex 2K, all of which raised serious questions about the legitimacy of many of the women involved.

References

External links
Official Website
Misyar Marriage Site

Online dating services of the United States